Tranquilo Cappozzo Zironda (25 January 1918 – 14 May 2003) was a rower who represented Argentina in the 1948 and 1952 editions of the Summer Olympics, winning the gold medal in the latter.

Biography
Capozzo was born in the United States to an Italian mother. He moved first to Italy and then to Argentina. In 1948 he was eliminated in the semi-finals of the single sculls event. Four years later he won the gold medal in double sculls competition with Eduardo Guerrero. That was for 52 years the last gold medal at Olympics for Argentina until the victories of Soccer and Basketball men teams at the 2004 Summer Olympics. He died in Valle Hermoso, Córdoba Province, Argentina.

References

External links
 

1918 births
2003 deaths
Argentine male rowers
Olympic rowers of Argentina
Rowers at the 1948 Summer Olympics
Rowers at the 1952 Summer Olympics
Olympic gold medalists for Argentina
Olympic medalists in rowing
Medalists at the 1952 Summer Olympics
American people of Italian descent
American emigrants to Italy
Citizens of Italy through descent
American emigrants to Argentina
Italian emigrants to Argentina
Naturalized citizens of Argentina
Argentine people of Italian descent
Sportspeople of Italian descent